Oigawa Maru (大井川丸) was a  transport ship of the Imperial Japanese Army during World War II.

On 10 December 1941, while unloading troops at Pandan, Philippines, she was bombed and damaged and beached to prevent sinking.

She left Rabaul, New Britain on 1 March 1943, as part of Operation 81, carrying a cargo of troops, equipment, fuel, landing craft and ammunition for Lae, New Guinea. The convoy was attacked by aircraft of the United States Army Air Forces and Royal Australian Air Force from 2 March 1943, known as the Battle of the Bismarck Sea. Oigawa Maru was bombed and damaged on 3 March, and was later sunk by motor torpedo boats PT-143 and PT-150 and sank at 

There were 78 crewmen and 1,151 troops of the 51st Division who were killed in action.

Notes

References

1941 ships
Ships built in Japan
Maritime incidents in December 1941
Maritime incidents in March 1943